Lawrence G. Costanzo is a former Supreme Master of the Knights of Columbus fourth degree (elected in 1961) and former Deputy Secretary of State of Arizona.

References

Living people
Year of birth missing (living people)